Joshua Harrison (born 15 June 1995) is an Australian racing cyclist, who last rode for UCI Continental team . In 2015, he finished fourth in the under-23 time trial at the Oceania Cycling Championships.

References

External links

1995 births
Living people
Australian male cyclists
Place of birth missing (living people)